Roy Meehan (21 July 1931 – 19 July 2011) was a New Zealand wrestler. He competed at the 1964 Summer Olympics.

References

External links
 

1931 births
2011 deaths
Olympic wrestlers of New Zealand
Wrestlers at the 1964 Summer Olympics
New Zealand male sport wrestlers
Sportspeople from Auckland